Tether containing UBX domain for GLUT4 (TUG) is a protein that in humans is encoded by the ASPSCR1 gene.

This gene is a candidate gene for alveolar soft part sarcoma (ASPS). It has been found that ASPSCR1 can undergo oncogenic rearrangement with transcription factor TFE3 gene, creating an aberrant gene that is a stronger transcriptional activator than TFE3 alone. This fusion oncogene encodes for a chimeric transcription factor, which is responsible for the production of multiple molecules that contribute to ASPS and also to renal cell carcinomas. Several alternatively spliced transcript variants of this gene have been described, but their full length nature has not been determined.

References

External links

Further reading

Oncogenes